is a Japanese actor and singer. He won the award for best actor at the 9th Yokohama Film Festival for Eien no 1/2 and at the 9th Hochi Film Award for The Miracle of Joe Petrel.

Filmography

Film
 The Miracle of Joe Petrel (1984)
 Chōchin (1987)
 A Better Tomorrow III (1989)
 Spy Games (1989)
 Eien no 1/2 (1987)
 Happy Flight (2008)
 It All Began When I Met You (2013)
 Good Morning Show (2016)
 Survival Family (2017)
 Kazoku no Hanashi (2018)
 Fortuna's Eye (2019)Dr. Coto's Clinic 2022 (2022), Taketoshi Hara

Television series
 Doberman Deka (1980)
 Dr. Coto's Clinic (2003–06), Taketoshi Hara
 Gō (2011), Azai Nagamasa
 Tokyo Control (2011)
 Overprotected Kahoko'' (2017)

References

External links

1958 births
20th-century Japanese male actors
21st-century Japanese male actors
Living people
People from Kawasaki, Kanagawa